Personal data services or personal datastores (PDS) are services to let an individual store, manage and deploy their key personal data in a highly secure and structured way.

They give the user a central point of control for their personal information (e.g. interests, contact information, affiliations, preferences, friends). The user's data attributes being managed by the service may be stored in a co-located repository, or they may be stored in multiple external distributed repositories, or a combination of both. Attributes from a PDS may be accessed via an API. Users of the same PDS instance may be allowed to selectively share sets of attributes with other users. A data ecosystem is developing where such sharing among projects or "operators" may become practicable.

Open Source Projects

Cloud-only
Note: Cloud-based PDSes are sometimes called personal data clouds or personal clouds.
 (HAT) Hub-of-All-Things
 Personium.io - open-source personal datastore
 SOLID Project - SOLID (Social Linked Data) is an open-source web decentralization project led by Tim Berners-Lee.
 Atsign - Open source end-to-end encrypted and public personal data service

Cloud or Edge
 Decentralized Web Node - Data storage and message relay mechanism entities can use to locate public or private permissioned data related to a given Decentralized Identifier (DID)

Development Tools
 Dogsheep Project - Build your own Personal Data Warehouse. Dogsheep is a collection of tools (open-source) for personal analytics using SQLite and Datasette (Python).

Inactive
 data.fm - an open source, PDS with a centralized underlying attribute store as well as an API to enable bi-directional attribute updates from external websites and services. The APIs are based on standards and include WebDav, SPARQL and linked data.  Data formats exchanged include RDF, XML and JSON.
 The Locker Project - an open source, JavaScript-based, PDS with a centralized underlying attribute store that exists on a person's personal computer as well as an API to support local applications.
 openPDS/SafeAnswers - openPDS/SafeAnswers allows users to collect, store, and give fine-grained access to their data all while protecting their privacy.
 Higgins - Higgins is an open source project dedicated to giving individuals more control over their personal identity, profile and social network data. Includes a personal datastore.
 ID Hole - a dynamic and commercial consumer PDS that allows for the storing of personal data and the dynamic sharing of that data with other parties.

Services

For-profit 
 Atsign 
 CitizenMe 
 CozyCloud - based in France
 Dataswift Ltd - operator of the HAT service
 DigiMe
 iGrant.io, a data intermediation service based out of Sweden
 Meeco
 OwnYourInfo - a personal information storing and sharing application.
 Prifina - a personal data engine that allows individuals get value from their data and empowers developers to build applications on top of user-held data.

For-profit Enterprise 
 Inrupt
 iGrant.io, a data intermediation service based out of Sweden

Not-for-profit Personal 
 Mydex - empowers individuals to manage their lives through convenient, trustworthy access and control of their personal data and how it is used by them and others. This is achieved through interoperable API-based components for identity, consent and personal data management.

See also
 Data vault modeling
 Identity management
 Privacy by design
 Vendor relationship management

References

External links
 
 New market for 'empowering personal data services "will transform relationships between customers and brands" - Ctrl-Shift

Identity management systems
Privacy